The Empire Award for Best Comedy is an Empire Award presented annually by the British film magazine Empire to honor the best comedy film of the previous year. The Empire Award for Best Comedy is one of four new Best Film ongoing awards which were first introduced at the 11th Empire Awards ceremony in 2006 (along with Best Horror, Best Sci-Fi/Fantasy and Best Thriller) with Team America: World Police receiving the award. The Death of Stalin is the most recent winner in this category. Winners are voted by the readers of Empire magazine.

Winners and nominees
In the list below, winners are listed first in boldface, followed by the other nominees. The number of the ceremony (1st, 2nd, etc.) appears in parentheses after the awards year, linked to the article (if any) on that ceremony.

2000s

2010s

References

External links

Comedy
Awards for best film